Giovanni Lorenzo (born 13 October 1980) is a Dominican professional boxer who turned pro in 2002.

Professional boxing record

References

External links
 

1980 births
Living people
Dominican Republic male boxers
Super-middleweight boxers
People from San Cristóbal, Dominican Republic